The Carol Weymuller Open 2015 is the women's edition of the 2015 Carol Weymuller Open, which is a tournament of the PSA World Tour event International (Prize money : 50 000 $). The event took place at The Heights Casino in Brooklyn, New York in the United States from 1 October to 5 October. Nour El Sherbini won her first Carol Weymuller Open trophy, beating Joelle King in the final.

Prize money and ranking points
For 2014, the prize purse was $50,000. The prize money and points breakdown is as follows:

Seeds

Draw and results

See also
2015 PSA World Tour
Carol Weymuller Open

References

External links
 PSA Carol Weymuller Open 2015 website
 Carol Weymuller Open 2015 SquashSite website

PSA World Tour
Carol Weymuller Open
Carol Weymuller Open
2015 in women's squash
2015 in sports in New York (state)
Squash in New York (state)
Carol Weymuller Open